Gold v. Eddy, 1 Mass. 1 (1804), was the first recorded case in the official reports of the Massachusetts Supreme Judicial Court.

Ruling
According to the reporter's summation:
In an action by the endorser against the promisor of a promissory note negotiated subsequent to the day of payment, the defendant may go into such evidence as he would have been entitled to had the action been brought by the original promisee. The deposition of a person used in a former trial is competent evidence in a review, though the deponent is a party to the suit, having become administrator of one of the original parties.

References

External links
 Synopsis and Text of the decision

Massachusetts state case law
Negotiable instrument law
United States state evidence case law
1804 in United States case law
1804 in Massachusetts